Baetis alius is a species of small minnow mayfly in the family Baetidae. It is found in the northwestern United States.

References

Further reading

 

Mayflies
Articles created by Qbugbot
Insects described in 1954